Kenryō Kanamatsu (1915-1986) was a translator, author, and lifelong devotee of Jōdo Shinshū, sometimes called "Shin Buddhism". His seminal work, Naturalness, (written in 1949), was an introduction of Jōdo Shinshū to the Western world.

Biography
Born in Kyoto in 1915, Kanamatsu received his B.A. in philosophy at Ōtani University. A Fulbright scholar at Cornell University and the University of Chicago, he received his doctorate and became a Professor at Otani University. A translator as well as an author, Kanamatsu translated the works of Plato into Japanese. In 1971 he published a book on the theology and cosmology of Plato.

References

Bibliography

External links
List of works at Worldcat

1915 births
1986 deaths
Translators to Japanese
Buddhist philosophy
Shin Buddhists
20th-century Japanese translators